Michael Kwame Adusei Boateng (born 17 August 1991) is an English former professional footballer who played primarily as a right back. In June 2014, Boateng was sentenced to 16 months' imprisonment for his part in an attempted match-fixing fraud.

Early life
As a youngster growing up he played for Addiscombe Corinthians. He attended Archbishop Tenison's School from 2002 to 2007 where he was a regular in the school team. He was an academy player at Crystal Palace before being released.

Club career 
Born in Peckham, London, Boateng was a youth player at Woking, this was the period of time he had a growth spurt, where he featured heavily and appeared for their reserves. In July 2010, he signed for Carshalton Athletic, where he was their starting right back and put in performances which built up some interest.

During the start of preseason for the 2011–12 season he was invited on a two-week trial with Bristol Rovers, where he featured in several friendlies. In July 2011 he signed for Bristol Rovers on a one-year contract with a further year option.

In an interview in the Bristol Evening Post, Boateng expressed his delight in joining the team: "To have a chance in the professional game is all I've ever wanted. My family are delighted for me. I'm sad to be moving away from them in London, but I am really happy to be starting what is a new chapter in my life."

He made his debut for Bristol Rovers on 6 September 2011, when he came on as a 76th-minute substitute for Danny Woodards in a Football League Trophy match against Wycombe Wanderers.

Soon after, Boateng went on a two-month loan to Tonbridge Angels, and then to Sutton United in December.

Following his release from Bristol Rovers, he had trials at Oxford United, Bradford City and Mansfield Town.

In October 2012, he signed for Bromley. He made his debut on 14 October 2012, in Bromley's non-league day match against local rivals Welling United.

He left Bromley in November 2012 and returned to Sutton United. In March 2013 Boateng joined Newport County, he was released in May 2013. He joined Whitehawk, but on 5 December 2013, he was charged with conspiracy to defraud as part of an investigation into match-fixing. He was sacked by Whitehawk the following day.

Style of play
Boateng is an athletic full back and known for his adventurous play and surging runs.

Personal life
In June 2015, Boateng was sentenced to jail for a second time for drug dealing.

Boateng works as a personal trainer and is a co-host on the podcast Banged Up where he talks about his time in prison.

References

External links

1991 births
Living people
Footballers from Peckham
English footballers
England semi-pro international footballers
Association football defenders
Carshalton Athletic F.C. players
Bristol Rovers F.C. players
Tonbridge Angels F.C. players
Sutton United F.C. players
Newport County A.F.C. players
National League (English football) players
People educated at Archbishop Tenison's Church of England High School, Croydon
Whitehawk F.C. players
Black British sportsmen
Bromley F.C. players
English fraudsters
Sportspeople convicted of crimes